Warwick Smeeton (29 September 1895 – 1 November 1970) was a New Zealand cricketer. He played eight first-class matches for Auckland between 1913 and 1930.

See also
 List of Auckland representative cricketers

References

External links
 

1895 births
1970 deaths
New Zealand cricketers
Auckland cricketers
Cricketers from Auckland